Formed in 1963, the Canadian Union of Students (CUS) was the successor organization of the National Federation of Canadian University Students (NFCUS) formed in 1926.  CUS like NFCUS was essentially a binational coalition of student councils at Canadian universities. Throughout the 1960s, CUS became increasing anti-war and Marxist-inspired, in part as a result of the Student Union for Peace Action especially after it ceased operating in 1966, following the creation of the Company of Young Canadians. CUS's increasing critique of capitalism and the US war on Vietnam led to a reaction by many CUS members who orchestrated a series of withdrawal referendums. CUS became non-viable by 1969 and ceased operating. Canadian students were without a formal national student organization until the National Union of Students (Canada) was formed in 1972. NUS was the precursor of the Canadian Federation of Students. Thus the National Federation of Canadian University Students (NFCUS) and the left-wing Canadian Student Assembly (CSA) of the 1930s, to the reformed NFCUS after 1944, to CUS in the sixties, to NUS in the seventies, to CFS of 1981 on, represents a long tradition of national student organizing in Canada.

Quebec members of CUS could not support federal funding of a provincial jurisdiction that was inherent in the Canada Student Loan Program, established in 1964.  CUS lost most Quebec members, who broke from CUS and formed .

Moses argues that CUS became highly vulnerable in the late 1960s because it had lost its traditional movement catalysts: by 1966, student loans and bursaries had never been so good, tuition fees were frozen and students were being taken seriously by politicians and given representation in university governance—all of these things had been key demands of NFCUS and CUS. In other words, CUS had fallen victim to its own success. It had realized its raisons d'être policies at the same time it was radicalizing over the Vietnam war. As James Harding would put it, SUPA and de facto CUS, would become after 1967, "an ethical movement in search of an analysis".

The main point that pervades Moses's work (1995, 2001, 2004) is that students had the ability to change the conditions of historicity, an idea he borrows from the French sociologist Alain Touraine.  Moses explains that historicity can be understood as the sum total of social relations and cultural orientations of social actors that exist at any one time.  Moses claims NFCUS and CUS activism helped change the conditions of historicity during the 1960s.  This is evident in the policies of the  Canada Student Loan Program and various provincial student aid programs, relatively stable tuition fees (until late 1970s) and realization of academocracy; that is, representation on university governance. As significant change agents of state policies in the 1960s, NFCUS and CUS activism of the 1950s and 1960s would have a bearing on the more institutionalized forms and practices of student organizations in the 1970s and thereafter. Moses argues that by helping shift the social relations on the "historical field of action' in particular, student organizations-state relations, NFCUS and CUS were key social agents in the formation of Canadian democratic institutions, most obviously, increased access to postsecondary education.

References

Further reading

 Robert Fredrick Clifts (2002), The Fullest Development of Human Potential, the Canadian Union of Students, 1963–69, MA Thesis, University of British Columbia
 Douglas Nesbitt (2010), The 'Radical Trip' of the Canadian Union of Students,1963–69, MA Thesis, Trent University (available at Theses Canada)
 Archives of the Canadian Union of Students and the National Federation of Canadian University Students at the William Ready Archives of McMaster University

Students' associations in Canada
Groups of students' unions
Student political organizations